Thomaz Bellucci was the defending champion but lost to Federico Delbonis in the first round.
Mikhail Youzhny won the title, defeating Robin Haase in the final, 6–3, 6–4.

Seeds
The top four seeds receive a bye into the second round.

Draw

Finals

Top half

Bottom half

Qualifying

Seeds
All seeds receive a bye into the second round.

Qualifiers

Qualifying draw

First qualifier

Second qualifier

Third qualifier

Fourth qualifier

References
 Main Draw
 Qualifying Draw

2013 ATP World Tour
2013 Singles
Singles